Masterman may refer to:
 Masterman (horse), an American Thoroughbred racehorse
 Julia R. Masterman School, a middle and secondary school located in Philadelphia, Pennsylvania
 ST Masterman, an Admiralty tugboat
 A Lover in Pawn, a 1920 Swedish film, known as Mästerman in Swedish

People

Sons of Thomas W. Masterman

 Arthur Masterman (1869–1941) British zoologist and author
 Charles Masterman (1873–1927), British Liberal politician and journalist
 Howard Masterman (1867–1933) Bishop of Plymouth
 Walter S. Masterman (1876–1946), English author of mystery, fantasy, horror and science fiction

Other people named Masterman
 Edward Masterman (1880–1957), senior Royal Air Force officer
 Jeff Masterman, Australian rugby league footballer (played in the 1970s and 1980s)
 John Cecil Masterman (1891–1977), academic and author involved in English anti-espionage during World War II
 Lucy Masterman (1884–1977), British Liberal politician, diarist, and poet; wife of Charles F. G. Masterman
 Margaret Masterman (1910–1986), British linguist and philosopher; daughter of Charles F. G. Masterman
 Rex Hunt (diplomat) or Sir Rex Masterman Hunt (born 1926), British diplomat and colonial administrator
 Sir Thomas Hardy, 1st Baronet or Sir Thomas Masterman Hardy (1769–1839), officer of the Royal Navy
 Wally Masterman (1888–1965), English footballer

Characters
 Edward Henry Masterman, a character in Agatha Christie's novel Murder on the Orient Express

See also 
 Master Man